La Chiquinquirá Church is a church in Maracaibo, Venezuela. The feast day of the church is November 18. Annually on this day many thousands of people gather around the church.

The basilica enshrines a replica image of the famed painting of Our Lady of Chiquinquirá in which this church is dedicated to. Pope Benedict XV authorized the canonical coronation of the image by decree granted to the Bishop of Zulia, Arturo Celestino Álvarez on 16 July 1917. The coronation ceremony would not be carried out until 18 November 1942, 25 years after its approval.

References

18th-century Roman Catholic church buildings in Venezuela
Buildings and structures in Maracaibo
Basilica churches in Venezuela
Roman Catholic churches completed in 1770
1770 establishments in the Spanish Empire